SS Norisle is a Canadian steam-powered automobile ferry that sailed the route between Tobermory and South-Baymouth Manitoulin Island alongside her sister ships, the  and the , owned by the Owen Sound Transportation Company Limited.

The name Norisle is derived from "Nor", a contraction of the Northern Region of Lake Huron, and "Isle", referring to Manitoulin Island.

The SS Norisle is no longer operating as a museum. This is mainly due to the vessel's age which had raised safety concerns. According to locals in the area the museum was shut down in 2008.

Ferry operations
The ship is 215ft in length. The Norisle was built at the Collingwood shipyards in 1946—the first steamship built in Canada after the end of World War II. Her engines were actually designed and built for a Royal Canadian Navy corvette, however because of the end of the war, they were put into the Norisle instead.  They are now the only remaining engines of their type in existence today. The ship had two doors on the starboard with a ramp that allowed vehicles to drive on and off the vessel during her service as a ferry. She sailed until the year 1974, when she and her sistership, the Norgoma, were replaced by the much larger and more modern  which could accommodate a much larger number of automobiles, and passengers (but no livestock).

Retirement
The Norisle is now permanently berthed at the Assiginack Museum Complex on Manitoulin Island as a museum ship for tourists to explore. For the last few years it has also served as a training ground for Canadian Naval Cadets.

In recent years, the Norisle has fallen into a state of disrepair. The ship was slowly sinking due to rainwater entering through her engine room vents and the main smokestack. This has since been stopped by placing tarps over them. City leaders planned on having it towed to deep water and sunk as a dive site, however these plans have been halted because a support group for the Norisle has been recently formed (March 2007), "Friends of the Norisle."  The group plans to investigate refurbishing or utilizing the ship for beneficial reasons.

References

External links
 History of Ferries on the Great Lakes
 Assigincak Museum Complex - Manitoulin Island
 Official website
 Print of a painting of the Norisle coming into Tobermory

Ships built in Collingwood, Ontario
Norisle-class ferries
Transport in Manitoulin District
1946 ships